Kohlmann is a German surname. Notable people with the surname include:

Anneliese Kohlmann (1921–1977), German SS camp guard
Anthony Kohlmann (1771–1836), French Roman Catholic missionary and military chaplain
Clarence Kohlmann (1891–1944), American composer
Emma Kohlmann (born 1989), American artist
Evan Kohlmann (born 1979), American writer
Fabienne Kohlmann (born 1989), German hurdler
Janine Kohlmann (born 1990), German modern pentathlete
Michael Kohlmann (born 1974), German tennis player
Patricia Kohlmann (born 1968), Mexican swimmer
Patrick Kohlmann (born 1983), German/Irish footballer
Ralph Kohlmann, American lawyer and United States Marine Corps officer

See also
Kohlman

German-language surnames